Niall Breen (born 2 November 1989 in Gorey, County Wexford) is an Irish sportsperson.  He plays hurling with his local club Tara Rocks and has been a member of the Wexford senior inter-county team since 2011.

Playing career

Club

Breen plays his club hurling with the Tara Rocks club.

Inter-county

Breen has lined out at various grades for Wexford, beginning as substitute goalkeeper on the county's under-21 team.  His tenure was an unsuccessful one with Wexford losing the Leinster final to Kilkenny.

Breen made his senior championship debut against Antrim in 2011, replacing Noel Carton as first-choice goalkeeper.

References

1989 births
Living people
Tara Rocks hurlers
Wexford inter-county hurlers
People from Gorey